Verbiv is the name of two villages in Ternopil Oblast, Ukraine:

Verbiv, Berezhany Raion 
Verbiv, Pidhaitsi Raion

See also
Verbivka (disambiguation)